Sahika Inal is a Turkish scientist who is an associate professor and Chair of the Organic Bioelectronics Laboratory at King Abdullah University of Science and Technology. She is interested in the use of organic electronic materials for monitoring health, and the design of biocompatible devices that can interface with the human body. In 2021, she was shortlisted for the Nature Portfolio Scientific Achievement award.

Early life and education 
Inal was an undergraduate at Istanbul Technical University, where she studied textile engineering. She moved to the Free University of Berlin for graduate research and focused on polymer science. Her master's dissertation considered optical processes in organic solar cells. Inal stayed in Germany for her doctoral research, moving to the University of Potsdam where she studied responsive polymers for optical sensing. As part of this work she worked on phase transition polymer: polyelectrolytes. After earning her doctorate, she moved to the École nationale supérieure des mines de Saint-Étienne, where she worked as a postdoctoral researcher.

Research and career 
In 2021, Inal was appointed an associate professor at the King Abdullah University of Science and Technology, where she leads the Organic Bioelectronics group. Inal works with organic electronic materials for bioelectronics, and the development of spectroscopic and structural probes to monitor the movement of electrons and ions. 

In particular, she is interested in ionic-electronic conduction and the use of organic electronics to detect small biological signals. Inal has developed several electronic devices, including; optical devices for pathogen diagnostics, conducting polymer scaffolds for cell culture, electrochemical transistors and electrophoretic devices for localised drug delivery.

Selected publications

References 

Turkish women scientists
Living people
Year of birth missing (living people)
Free University of Berlin alumni
Istanbul Technical University alumni
University of Potsdam alumni
Academic staff of King Abdullah University of Science and Technology